The Potential Regiment Officers Course (PROC) (Normally pronounced "Pee-Rock") is an assessment tool of the Royal Air Force (RAF) in the United Kingdom, for people wishing to become an Officer in the Royal Air Force Regiment. Currently the candidates, who as of September 2017 can be male or female, will already have passed the Officer and Aircrew Selection Centre. It has been in existence since April 2008, where it was previously known as the Potential Regiment Officers Acquaintance Course (PROAC). This name was changed due to confusion over whether the course was assessed or merely an introduction to the RAF Regiment.

Requirements
Successful attendance at the course is required of any person who plans to train as an officer in the RAF Regiment. A candidate will be at least 17 years and 6 months of age at entrance, will hold a British passport, will have a minimum of 5 GCSEs graded A-C and 2 A-levels, or will have achieved a certified comparable education.

Content and location
PROC is a four-day assessment course, designed to complement the military's Officer and Aircrew Selection Centre, for men and women wishing to become an RAF Regiment Officer.

The course is held at RAF Honington, in Suffolk in East Anglia, England. Some training may also be given at other airbases or facilities.

The course is designed to discover a candidate's leadership qualities and ability to provide continued command in stressful situations. One's ability to communicate effectively, and one's physical condition, are also assessed.

Fitness assessment
Consisting of:
Multi-stage fitness test
Push-ups
Sit-ups
Swimming: 4 lengths of a 25-metre pool, followed by treading water for 2 minutes (performed in succession, without touching the sides or bottom of the pool)
Lift and carry - candidates must lift 40kg of weight from the floor onto a 1.6m platform
Lift and carry - candidates must carry 2 20 litre jerrycans 150m at a slow pace, set by the PTIs, which will last 2 and a half minutes. If they drop either can at any time, they fail.

All of these are carried out to the minimum required standard for the candidates' age and gender in accordance with RAF fitness standards; they are not considered arduous, and are rather a formality.

Gym assessment
The candidate will undergo 6 different gym assessments and aim to get the highest score they can. They will have 90 seconds on each, followed by 60 seconds to prepare for the next assessment. The assessments are: 
Lift and carry: the candidates will aim to lift 15kg onto a 1.6m platform as many times as they can
Kettle bell run: the candidates will aim to complete as many 20m shuttles carrying 2 15kg kettle bells 
Shuttles: the candidates will aim to complete as many 20m shuttles, unladen
Run and crawl: the candidates will aim to complete as many 20m shuttles as they can - the first 5m on their feet, the middle 10m crawling on their belt buckles, the final 5m on their feet
Casualty evacuation: the candidates will aim to complete as many 20m shuttles dragging a 50kg dummy
Assault order run: the candidates will aim to complete as many 20m shuttles carrying a 15kg bergan and rubber rifle

Presentation
The candidates will have written a presentation on a current affairs topic of their choice prior to coming - this can be about anything, and is absolutely not restricted to military matters, so long as it has occurred within the previous few months. The candidates will deliver a 10 minute presentation on the subject at the officers' mess, after which they will field questions. When this is done, they will be taken to the bar to talk to serving RAF Regiment officers, and thereafter will have dinner at the mess.

Assault Course
The candidates traverse the RAF Regiment assault course as an initial introduction, and are invited to try the obstacles individually. After the candidates are familiar with the course, they are ordered the run the course, which begins and ends with a 100-metre sprint around evenly spaced barrels. The course is timed and every obstacle must be completed to pass. Some candidates have difficulty getting over the nine-foot wall; to avoid this problem it is important that candidates practice over-grip pull ups. The course must be completed within around 5 minutes for the candidate to be successful.

Interviews

The candidates will be interviewed by IC Regiment Recruitment flight. The interview will likely consist of their knowledge of RAF Regiment history and infrastructure, and also their motivation for joining.

Shortly after the interview they will be summoned for the tell, in which the Regiment officer will tell them what recommendation the RAF Regiment will be making with regards to their advancing to Initial Officer Training at RAF Cranwell.

Typical Course Structure

Day 1
Pick up from Thetford and transit to RAF Barnham
Administration Briefing

Day 2
Opening Address
RAF Regiment Heritage tour (trip to RAF Regiment museum and RAF Regiment field squadrons)
Weapons Demonstration

Day3
Fitness assessments & Swim Test
Gym assessment
Presentation to Officers' Mess
PROC Hosted Dinner

Day 4
Unsuccessful candidates are returned to Bury St Edmunds
Assault course
Interviews
Tell
Course Dispersal

External links
The RAF Regiment from WWII To The Present Day
Official RAF Regiment homepage
RAF Regiment History
The Official RAF Regiment Association website

References

Royal Air Force Regiment